Laurence Ekperigin (born February 21, 1988) is a British-American professional basketball player who currently plays for JA Vichy-Clermont Métropole Basket in France's LNB Pro B league. He played college basketball at Le Moyne before playing professionally in South Korea, Italy, Spain, France and Israel.

College career
Ekperigin played four seasons for the Le Moyne College Dolphins, where he averaged 16.8 points and 10.0 rebounds per game.

Professional career
Ekperigin began his professional career with Ulsan Mobis Phoebus of the South Korean league, where he played 56 games, averaging 14.3 points and 7.3 rebounds.

In March 2011, he joined Pallacanestro Cantù of the Italian league who loaned him to Pallacanestro Biella. He would only play 3 games for Biella before joining CB Gran Canaria of the Spanish ACB league.

On July 4, 2014, he signed with JSF Nanterre for the 2014–15 season. Ekperigin won the 2015 EuroChallenge championship with Nanterre.

On July 1, 2016, he signed with Hermine Nantes of the LNB Pro B. Ekperigin played three seasons with Nantes, averaging 11 points, 6.6 rebounds and 3.5 assists per game in the 2018–19 season.

On August 26, 2019, he signed a one-year deal with Maccabi Kiryat Motzkin of the Israeli National League.

On February 28, 2023, he signed a deal for the remainder of the season with JA Vichy-Clermont Métropole Basket in the LNB Pro B league in France.

International career
Ekperigin plays for the Great Britain national basketball team and was part of the team that competed in the London International Basketball Invitational. Born in the United States, Ekperigin holds a British passport through his British mother.

References

External links
LNB Pro B profile
RealGM profile

1988 births
Living people
American expatriate basketball people in France
American expatriate basketball people in Israel
American expatriate basketball people in Italy
American expatriate basketball people in South Korea
American expatriate basketball people in Spain
American men's basketball players
Basketball players from New York City
Basket Ferentino players
British expatriate basketball people in Spain
British men's basketball players
CB Gran Canaria players
Centers (basketball)
English men's basketball players
Hermine Nantes Basket players
Maccabi Kiryat Motzkin basketball players
Nanterre 92 players
Le Moyne Dolphins men's basketball players
Liga ACB players
Pallacanestro Biella players
People from Cortlandt Manor, New York
Poitiers Basket 86 players
Power forwards (basketball)
Sportspeople from Westchester County, New York
Ulsan Hyundai Mobis Phoebus players